The rugby sevens at the 2006 Commonwealth Games was the third Commonwealth Games at which rugby sevens was played. It is one of the male-only sports at the Commonwealth Games, the other being boxing. The venue for the rugby competition was the Telstra Dome, on the western edge of Melbourne's Central Business District. Preliminary matches were held on 16 March, with the finals the following day.

Sixteen teams competed in the rugby sevens tournament as they were separated into four groups of four. The top two teams of each group qualified through to the cup finals while the bottom two would compete in the bowl. After finishing on top of Pool A, New Zealand won the gold medal match as they defeated England 29–21 in the final on 17 March 2006. Fiji claimed the bronze medal defeating Australia 24–17 in the 3rd place final. In the minor finals, Wales took out the plate final with Kenya winning the bowl.

Qualified teams

Pool Stage

Group A

Group B

Group C

Group D

Knock-out stage

Cup

Quarter-finals

Semi-finals

Bronze medal match

Gold medal match

Plate 
For teams knocked out of the Cup quarter finals

Plate semi-finals

Plate final – Playoff for 5th and 6th

Bowl

Bowl-quarter-finals

Bowl semi-finals

Bowl final – Playoff for 9th and 10th

Medalists

References

See also
 Commonwealth Rugby Sevens Championships
 Rugby sevens

2006
2006 Commonwealth Games events
Commonwealth Games
Rugby union in Victoria (Australia)
Rugby union competitions in Victoria